Cătălin Chirilă (born 11 May 1998) is a Romanian canoeist. He competed in the men's C-2 1000 metres event at the 2020 Summer Olympics.

References

External links
 

1998 births
Living people
Romanian male canoeists
Olympic canoeists of Romania
Canoeists at the 2020 Summer Olympics
People from Tulcea
ICF Canoe Sprint World Championships medalists in Canadian
Canoeists at the 2019 European Games
European Games medalists in canoeing
European Games bronze medalists for Romania